Demirkapı means "Iron gate" in Turkish and it may refer to;

Demirkapı, Şavşat, a village in Şavşat district of Artvin Province
Demirkapı, Mut, a village in Mut district of Mersin Province
Demirkapı, Susurluk, a village
Temir Kapig, a pass in Uzbekistan
Demir Kapija, a town in the Republic of Macedonia

See also
Iron Gates